Vivekananda Pictures is an Indian film production and distribution company, based at Chennai, India. The production company was established in 1977 by its founder, Tiruppur Mani. He produced around thirty movies under his banner . After a hiatus it produced the blockbuster movie Kaithi under Tiruppur Vivek who is now at the heilm of the Company All their films had Sivakumar and Sathyaraj as lead actor.

History 
The production house first feature film Kannan Ori Kaikuzhandai (1978) was directed by Venkatesh, in which Sivakumar and Sumithra played the lead roles. Following this film,  Sivakumar has been their choice for the lead actor for Rosappu Ravikkaikaari, Vandichakkaram, Aaniver, Aayiram Muthangal. Though first five films has got Sivakumar as male lead, the female leads were Sumithra for Kannan Ori Kaikuzhandai, Deepa for Rosappu Ravikkaikaari, Saritha for Vandichakkaram and Aaniver, Radha for Aayiram Muthangal. Late actor Vinu Chakravarthy was introduced as story and screenplay writer in Vandichakkaram and it was directed by K. Vijayan.  It is the debut movie for Silk Smitha in Tamil. Vandichakkaram won third prize at Tamil Nadu state award for best film for the year 1980. Vinu Chakravarthy was introduced as actor in Rosappu Ravikkaikaari and comedian Loose Mohan rose to fame through the same movie. In 1983, the company produced Imagial starring Sivaji Ganesan, Saritha, Sarath babu and others, music was composed by Gangai amaran. Their next was Eetti starred by Vijayakanth, Vishnuvardhan, Nalini, Viji and directed by Rajasekhar. Vidinja Kalyanam was their next which had Sathyaraj, Jayashree, Sujatha in lead roles and was directed by Manivannan. In 1988, they remade Mohanlal and Karthika starrer Malayalam movie Gandhinagar 2nd Street as Anna Nagar Mudhal Theru. Sathyaraj and Radha did the lead roles in this movie.

In the late 1990s, Mani planned a film titled Kadhal Sugamanathu starring his son Vivekanand in the lead role. However, the project eventually did not materialise. After a hiatus of two decades, the production company made its comeback by co-producing and distributing Kaithi (2019).

Filmography

External links

References 

Film production companies based in Chennai
1977 establishments in Tamil Nadu
Mass media companies established in 1977
Indian companies established in 1977